Diablo Foothills Regional Park is a  regional park of the East Bay Regional Park District. It is located in Contra Costa County, in the East Bay region of northern California.

Geography
The park lies in the Diablo Foothills of the northern Diablo Range, west of Mount Diablo and Mount Diablo State Park. The closest city is Walnut Creek. 

Diablo Foothills Regional Park is bordered by: Castle Rock Regional Recreation Area on the east, and Shell Ridge Open Space to the north. Together, these three parks provide  of parkland for visitors to enjoy.

See also

External links
 East Bay Regional Park.org:  official Diablo Foothills Regional Park  website

East Bay Regional Park District
Parks in Contra Costa County, California
Diablo Range
Mount Diablo